Biography: WWE Legends is a 2021 American documentary television series. A spin-off of A&E's Biography franchise, the series premiered on April 18, 2021.

On March 1, 2022, it was announced that A&E had ordered 35 more episodes of the series.

Plot
The series consists of two-hour documentaries on different WWE superstars, giving an insight into both their personal and on-screen lives.

Series overview

Episode list

Season 1 (2021)

Season 2 (2022)

Season 3 (2023)

References

External links
 

2020s American documentary television series
2021 American television series debuts
English-language television shows
A&E (TV network) original programming
Professional wrestling documentaries
Television series by WWE